Schnaittenbach is a town in the Amberg-Sulzbach district, in Bavaria, Germany. It is situated 16 km northeast of Amberg.

The town is twinned with Buchberg, Switzerland.

References

Amberg-Sulzbach